In prison systems, work release programs allow a prisoner who is sufficiently trusted or can be sufficiently monitored to go outside the prison and work at a place of employment, returning to prison when their shift is complete.

During the day Rec is available to those on good behavior and responding.

Some work release programs allow greater freedom for the prisoner, allowing prisoners who follow a Monday–Friday workweek to attend work and live at their homes on those days, and serve their sentences two days at a time on weekends. Depending on the terms of the program, the prisoner may serve their sentence in a halfway house or home confinement while not working.  Other work release programs can be offered to prisoners who are nearing the end of their terms and looking for a reintegration into civilian life, with a possible offer of full-time employment once the prisoner is released.

Countries routinely utilising work release programs in one form or another include the United States of America, Canada, the United Kingdom, New Zealand, France, Portugal, India, Thailand, and Indonesia.

Pros of work release 
Work release programs have the ability to have a positive impact on inmates and their ability to gain employment after they are released. Also, inmates who participate in work release programs are able to acquire jobs nearly twice as fast when compared to inmates who do not participate. Studies have shown that inmates who took part in a work release program received higher pay in their jobs after being released. Work release programs have also been shown to lower the recidivism rates among prisons.

Cost 
The El Paso County Sheriff's Office offers a work release program. Inmates who are sentenced to participate in work release programs are obligated to pay a fee of $22 per day.

Wisconsin 
The concept of work release was introduced in Wisconsin in 1913 under a law written by state senator Henry Huber. The program is often referred to locally as the "Huber Law" program.

See also

House arrest

References

Penology

/Edit Summary/ Sting/
In the Wrestlemania, Nov. 19 - The day of The "Plague Doctor" is reannounced May. 13 - (2005)